Monarchos (February 9, 1998 – October 22, 2016) was a champion American Thoroughbred racehorse who won the 2001 Kentucky Derby in the second fastest winning time and overall third fastest time in the race's history.

Background
Monarchos was sired by Maria's Mon– from whom he inherited his gray coat– out of the mare Regal Band. He was bred by Jim Squires, who wrote an account of this "rags to riches" horse entitled "Horse of a Different Colour". As a two-year-old in training, he was purchased for $170,000 by John C. Oxley on the advice of the colt's trainer, John Ward.

Racing career
Monarchos raced twice as a two-year-old, finishing eighth at Keeneland Racetrack on October 7, and third at Churchill Downs on November 24.

He made a winning three-year-old debut when taking a minor race at Gulfstream Park in January 2001 and followed up with a win in an allowance race in February. He established himself as a contender for the Kentucky Derby with his run in the Florida Derby in March. Ridden by Jorge Chavez, he won by four and a half lengths from Outofthebox and Invisible Ink. Chavez was impressed by the performance, saying that "when I asked him, he just exploded." Bill Nack, writing in Sports Illustrated, was equally enthusiastic, calling the win "electrifying" and drawing comparisons with other famous grays such as Spectacular Bid and Holy Bull.

In his final race before the Derby, Monarchos finished second to Congaree in the Wood Memorial Stakes. However, Ward described the race as "a perfect prep". At Churchill Downs on 5 May, Monarchos was the 10.5/1 fourth choice in the betting for the Derby. After being bumped at the start, he made steady progress on the outside and turned into the straight in sixth place. Chavez sent the gray colt to the lead a furlong from the finish, and Monarchos pulled clear to win by almost five lengths from Invisible Ink, with Congaree third and the favored Point Given fifth.

Monarchos' winning time was 1:59.97 for  miles, becoming only the second horse in Derby history to win the race in under 2 minutes, joining 1973 Triple Crown winner Secretariat, who ran 1:59  (at that time, the Derby was timed to the fifth of a second rather than to the hundredth of a second). As of 2022, no horse since Monarchos has broken the 2-minute barrier at the Derby.

In the Preakness Stakes, Monarchos was outrun in the early stages and finished sixth of the eleven runners behind Point Given. In the Belmont Stakes, he finished third, more than thirteen lengths behind the winner, Point Given. Some time after the race, it was discovered that Monarchos had sustained a hairline fracture to his right knee, which ruled him out for the rest of the season.

Monarchos was scheduled to return as a four-year-old with the Donn Handicap as his first target, but, after running third in a prep race, he injured a tendon in training in January 2002 and was retired.

Stud career
Monarchos was retired to Claiborne Farm, where his initial stud fee was $25,000. His most successful foals are Informed Decision, a winner of the Breeders' Cup Filly and Mare Sprint and a multiple graded stakes winner of $2.2 million, and Win Willy, winner of the Rebel Stakes and one-time Kentucky Derby contender, winner of over $1 million.  Other stakes winners include Japanese stakes winner Mr. Monarchos ($775k), multiple stakes winner Stormin Monarcho ($487k), multiple stakes winner Bingham, stakes winners Riley's Monarch and Stones River, Aces Star (Champion 2yo colt in Scandinavia) and others.

Monarchos stood at Nuckols Farm in Midway, Kentucky, at a fee of $2,000 for 2016.

In April 2011, Monarchos underwent surgery for colic at the Hagyard Equine Medical Institute.

On October 22, 2016, Monarchos died after undergoing surgery to repair a ruptured intestine. He went into surgery after showing signs of internal distress the night before. He was 18 years old at the time of his death.

Pedigree

References

1998 racehorse births
2016 racehorse deaths
Racehorses trained in the United States
Racehorses bred in Kentucky
Kentucky Derby winners
Thoroughbred family 4-r